Carl Esek Pray (March 30, 1870 – August 10, 1949) was the head coach of the  Central Michigan college football program from 1897 to 1899. A graduate of Olivet College, he was a history instructor at the Milwaukee Normal School after leaving Central Michigan. He was also a professor of history at Michigan State Normal College for 23 years, from 1913 to 1936.

Head coaching record

Football

References

1870 births
1949 deaths
Central Michigan Chippewas baseball coaches
Central Michigan Chippewas football coaches
Eastern Michigan University faculty
Olivet College alumni
People from Eaton County, Michigan